Glidewell is an English surname. Notable people with the surname include: 

 Alésia Glidewell (born 1978), American web series director, producer and voice actress
 Iain Glidewell (1924–2016), Lord Justice of Appeal, Judge of Appeal of the High Court of the Isle of Man, and Privy Councillor

English-language surnames